Ñawpallaqta or Ñawpa Llaqta (Quechua  ñawpa ancient, llaqta place (village, town, city, country, nation), "ancient place", Hispanicized and mixed spellings Ñaupallacta, Ñaupallaqta) is an archaeological site in Peru. It lies in the Ayacucho Region, Huanca Sancos Province, Carapo District. The site was declared a National Cultural Heritage (Patrimonio Cultural) of Peru.

References 

Archaeological sites in Peru
Archaeological sites in Ayacucho Region